Enos is an unincorporated community in McClellan Township, Newton County, in the U.S. state of Indiana.

History
Enos was laid out as a town in 1907.

Geography

References

Unincorporated communities in Newton County, Indiana
Unincorporated communities in Indiana